Avarzaman Rural District is a rural district (dehestan) in Samen District, Malayer County, Hamadan Province, Iran. At the 2006 census, its population was 6,337, in 1,623 families. The rural district has 10 villages.

References 

Rural Districts of Hamadan Province
Malayer County